Nogometni klub Koroška Dravograd or simply NK Dravograd is a Slovenian football club from Dravograd. It competes in the Slovenian Third League, the third tier of the Slovenian football league system. The club was founded in 1948.

Honours
Slovenian Second League
 Winners: 1998–99, 2001–02

Slovenian Third League
 Winners: 1995–96, 2017–18, 2018–19

References

External links
Official website 

Association football clubs established in 1948
Football clubs in Slovenia
1948 establishments in Slovenia